The 2010 Dhaka fire was a fire in the city of Dhaka, Bangladesh, on 3 June 2010, that killed at least 124 people (117 on spot, others later in hospital). The fire occurred in the Nimtali area of Old Dhaka.

Cause
The fire was started when an electrical transformer exploded. The head of the fire department speculated that the fire was fanned by perfumes, chemicals and other flammable products stored in shops. The density of the residential area affected made it difficult for firefighters to quell the blaze. Also, the narrow lanes of Old Dhaka and staircases of old buildings made it difficult for fire service equipment to enter the area.

Casualties
The fire affected multiple residential buildings in the Nimtoli area, and trapped residents inside apartments. At least 117 people were killed and over 100 injured by the fire. The fire affected a wedding party, which exacerbated the casualties. One of the buildings affected by the fire had no fire escapes and its windows were covered by metal grills.

The injured were treated at the Dhaka Medical College Hospital, which struggled to cope with the large number of patients suffering burns and smoke inhalation. According to a doctor at the hospital, most of the deaths appeared to have been caused by smoke inhalation rather than burns.

Rescue operations ceased on 4 June 2010.

Reactions
Sheikh Hasina, the Prime Minister, ordered an investigation into the fire. She also offered condolences to the victims and their families. The government announced that 5 June 2010 would be a day of mourning. The Bangladesh cricket team, who took the field the day after the fire during their tour of England, wore black armbands in remembrance.

Financial assistance
Mirza Ali Behrouze Ispahany the chairman of M.M. Ispahani came up with financial assistance for the victims.

See also
List of historic fires

References

2010 fires in Asia
2010 in Bangladesh
2010 disasters in Bangladesh
2010 fire
Explosions in 2010
Explosions in Dhaka
2010
June 2010 events in Bangladesh
Residential building fires